Asha Mande Sonko (born 1983) is a Ugandan football former player and former referee. She has been a member of the Uganda women's national team.

Club career
Sonko has played for Kampala United in Uganda.

International career
Sonko capped for Uganda at senior level during the 2000 African Women's Championship.

References

External links

1983 births
Living people
Sportspeople from Kampala
Ugandan women's footballers
Uganda women's international footballers
Women association football referees
Women's association football referees
Women's association footballers not categorized by position